Western Bicutan is one of the 28 barangays of Taguig, Metro Manila, Philippines. It is the city's most populated barangay and the largest in terms of land area. It is located in the northwestern part of the city. Arca South, Food Terminal Inc., Technological University of the Philippines – Taguig, the southern portion of Naval Station Jose Francisco, Philippine Navy Golf Club, AFPOBAI Libingan ng mga Bayani, Taguig-Pateros District Hospital, Veterans Museum, and TESDA headquarters are located in the barangay.

History

References 

Taguig
Barangays of Metro Manila